Cairo is the capital city of Egypt.

Cairo may also refer to:

Places

United States 
 Cairo, Georgia, a city
 Cairo, Illinois, a city
 Cairo Precinct, Alexander County, Illinois
 Cairo, Indiana, an unincorporated community
 Cairo, Kansas, an unincorporated community
 Cairo Township, Renville County, Minnesota
 Cairo, Missouri, a village
 Cairo, Nebraska, a village
 Cairo, New York, a town
 Cairo (CDP), New York, a census-designated place in the town
 Cairo, Ohio, a village
 Cairo, Stark County, Ohio, an unincorporated community
 Cairo, Oklahoma, an unincorporated community
 Cairo, Oregon, an unincorporated community
 Cairo, Crockett County, Tennessee, an unincorporated community
 Cairo, Sumner County, Tennessee, an unincorporated community
 Cairo, West Virginia, a town

Elsewhere 
 Cairo, a community in the township of Dawn-Euphemia, Ontario, Canada
 Cairo Governorate, Egypt
 Cairo Montenotte, a commune in the Liguria region of Italy
 Cape Cairo, Nunavut, Canada
 El Cairo, Colombia, a town and municipality
 Monte Cairo, a mountain in the Lazio region of Italy

People 
 Cairo (surname)
 Cairo Santos (born 1991), American football placekicker

Ships 
 HMS Cairo (D87), a 1918 ship in the Royal Navy
 USS Cairo (1861), an ironclad river gunboat in the United States Navy during the 19th century
 RMS Cairo, original name of HMT Royal Edward, a passenger ship sunk during the First World War
 German auxiliary cruiser Stier, originally the freighter Cairo

Arts and entertainment 
 Cairo (1942 film), an American film starring Jeanette MacDonald
 Cairo (1963 film), an American film starring George Sanders
 Cairo (comics), a 2007 graphic novel by G. Willow Wilson and M.K. Perker
 Cairo (novel), a 2013 novel by Chris Womersley
 Cairo Trilogy, a 1956 trilogy of novels written by Naguib Mahfouz
 Joel Cairo, a major character in the novel The Maltese Falcon and its film adaptations
 "Cairo", a song by Andy Partridge from Take Away / The Lure of Salvage
 "Cairo" (Karol G and Ovy on the Drums song), 2022

Businesses 
 Cairo International Bank, a commercial bank in Uganda
 Cairo Aviation, a charter airline based in Cairo, Egypt
 Air Cairo, a low fare airline based in Cairo, Egypt

Computing 
 Cairo (dingbat font), a bitmap dingbat font on early Macintosh computers
 Cairo (graphics), a free software vector graphics library
 Cairo (operating system), the internal Microsoft code name for a 1990s technology project

Other uses 
 Cairo (dog), a US Navy SEAL war dog who was part of the mission to kill Osama bin Laden
 The Cairo, an apartment building in Washington, D.C.
 Cairo Gang, a group of 18 MI5 agents sent to Dublin during the Anglo-Irish War
 Cairo Road, an important thoroughfare in Lusaka, Zambia
 , an acronym for clarifying responsibilities for a process or a project

See also 
 Cairo poets, a literary group based in Cairo, Egypt, during World War II
 Cairo pentagonal tiling, a geometrical pattern
 
 Kairo (disambiguation)
 Chi Rho, an ancient Christian symbol
 Chiro (disambiguation)
 Clairo (born 1998), American singer-songwriter